Alton Adolor Lessard (August 2, 1909 – June 3, 1976) was a Superior Court justice credited as being “one of the architects in the rejuvenation of the Democratic Party in Maine” (He was as chairman of the Democratic State Committee when Edmund Muskie was elected to the US Senate, the first Democrat in 40 years).

Lessard also served two terms as Mayor of Lewiston, Maine.  Lessard also served in the Maine State Senate, and U.S. Attorney.

References

1976 deaths
Maine Democratic Party chairs
Mayors of Lewiston, Maine
Maine state senators